Nardo Casolari (born 10 January 1997, in Lugo) is an Italian rugby union player.
His usual position is as a Flanker and he currently plays for Petrarca Padova in Top10.

In 2020–21 Pro14 season, he was named as Additional Player for Zebre.

In 2017, Casolari was named in the Italy Under 20 squad.

References 

It's Rugby England profile
Ultimate Rugby Profile

1997 births
Living people
Italian rugby union players
Rugby union flankers